Callicercops iridocrossa is a moth of the family Gracillariidae. It is known from China (Yunnan, Sichuan, Hong Kong) and Japan (the Ryukyu Islands). The larvae feed on Bauhinia japonica. They probably mine the leaves of their host plant.

References

Gracillariinae
Moths described in 1938
Moths of Japan